Pantelimon V. Sinadino (17 July 1875 in Chișinău – 1940 in Gulag) was a Bessarabian politician. He served as mayor of Chișinău (1903–1904, 1905–1907, 1909–1910). He was the grandson of Pantelimon I. Sinadino.

Gallery

Works
 Chișinăul nostru (1904–06, Amintiri) (manuscris);
 Creditul în Basarabia – Chișinău, 1929;
 Ce este necesar pentru însănătoșirea vieții economice în Basarabia – Chișinău, Tip. Dreptatea, 1916

Bibliography
 
 

1875 births
1940 deaths
People from Chișinău
People from Kishinyovsky Uyezd
Moldovan people of Greek descent
Romanian people of Moldovan descent
Members of the 2nd State Duma of the Russian Empire
Members of the 3rd State Duma of the Russian Empire
Members of the 4th State Duma of the Russian Empire
Moldovan MPs 1917–1918
Mayors of Chișinău